Jimmy Godden (11 August 1879 – 5 March 1955) was a British film actor.

He was educated at Christ's Hospital and was in the Civil Service before becoming a concert pianist. Godden later turned to the stage and made his debut in pantomime at the Theatre Royal, Plymouth, then going on to the London West End doing a number of comedies and revues.

Filmography

 Big Business (1930) – Oppenheimer
 The Wife's Family (1931) – Doc Knott
 The Last Coupon (1932) – Geordie Bates
 His Wife's Mother (1932) – Mr. Trout
 Money Talks (1932) – Joe Bell
 For the Love of Mike (1932) – Henry Miller
 Crime on the Hill (1933) – Landlord
 Happy (1933) – Brummelberg
 Their Night Out (1933) – Archibald Bunting
 Meet My Sister (1933) – Pogson
 Hawley's of High Street (1933) – Mayor
 The Outcast (1934) – Harry
 Those Were the Days (1934) – Pat Maloney
 The Luck of a Sailor (1934) – Betz
 Sometimes Good (1934) – Colonel Mortimer
 Give Her a Ring (1934) – Uncle Rifkin
 The Great Defender (1934) – Inspector Holmes
 My Song Goes Round the World (1934) – Manager
 Radio Parade of 1935 (1934) – Vere de V. de Vere
 Mister Cinders (1934) – Perkins (uncredited)
 Dandy Dick (1935) – Creecher (uncredited)
 Royal Cavalcade (1935) – Harry
 The Student's Romance (1935) – Bit part
 Lend Me Your Wife (1935) – Uncle Jerry
 I Give My Heart (1935) – Minor role (uncredited)
 Music Hath Charms (1935) – Bit Part (uncredited)
 It's a Bet (1935) – Mayor
 King of the Castle (1936) – Bailiff
 Living Dangerously (1936) – Member of Council
 Once in a Million (1936) – Plume
 Someone at the Door (1936) – Police Constable O'Brien
 The Marriage of Corbal (1936) – Minor Role (uncredited)
 A Star Fell from Heaven (1936) – Undetermined role (uncredited)
 Keep Your Seats, Please (1936) – X-Ray Doctor (uncredited)
 Feather Your Nest (1937) – Mr. Higgins
 Sing as You Swing (1937)
 The Dance of Death (1938)
 Glamour Girl (1938) – Arnold
 Father O'Nine (1938) – Colonel Briggs
 Spare a Copper (1940) – Manager (uncredited)
 The Farmer's Wife (1941) – Sergeant (Last appearance)

References

External links
 

1879 births
1955 deaths
English male film actors
People from Maidstone
People educated at Christ's Hospital
Male actors from Kent
20th-century English male actors